The Luck of the Irish is a British drama film directed by Donovan Pedelty, and starring Richard Hayward and Kay Walsh. It was based on a novel by Victor Haddick, and written by Victor Haddick and Donovan Pedelty.

It was made as a quota film at Elstree Studios. The production company Crusade Films had a contract to supply films for release by the British subsidiary of Paramount Pictures. The film's sets were designed by the art director Andrew Mazzei.

Plot
An Irishman tries to save his ancestral home through the fortunes of a racehorse.

Cast
 Richard Hayward as Sam Mulhern
 Nan Cullen as Widow Whistler
 Charles Fagan as Sergeant Doyle
 Meta Grainger as Lady O'Donnel
 Harold Griffin as Simon Reid
 John M. Henderson as Sir Richard O'Donnel
 R. H. MacCandless as Gavin Grogan
 Niall MacGinnis as Derek O'Neill
 Jimmy Mageean as Sir Brian O'Neill
 Charlotte Tedlie as Hortense O'Neill
 Kay Walsh as Eileen O'Donnel

References

Bibliography
 Wood, Linda. British Films, 1927-1939. British Film Institute, 1986.

External links
 
 Luck of the Irish at Digital Film Archive website

1936 films
British drama films
1936 drama films
Films directed by Donovan Pedelty
Quota quickies
Films shot at Rock Studios
Films set in Ireland
Paramount Pictures films
British black-and-white films
1930s English-language films
1930s British films